Al-Uqaydat is a large Arab tribe which straddles Syria's eastern border with Iraq. It is the largest tribe in the Deir ez-Zor province and according to Max von Oppenheim, it is the largest tribe in all of Mesopotamia. Members of the tribe can be found on both sides of the Iraqi-Syrian border.

Uqaydat tribe is descended from the tribe of Zubaid.

Structure 

The tribe is divided into three branches which are in turn divided into multiple clans:
 Abu Kamel
 Abu Hassan clan
 Al-Qaraan clan
 Abu Rahmat clan
 Al-Baqir clan
 Al-Shuwait clan
 Abu Kamal
 Al-Mireh clan and their sheikh is Mohamed Al-Gharab Al-Harsa
Al-Hassoun clan and their sheikh is  Ayman Al-Daham Al-dandal
 Al-Damim clan and their sheikh is Kamal Al-Naji Al-Jirah
 Al-Daleej clan
 Al-Marashda clan
 Al-Jaalkah clan
 Abu Zamil (al-Shaitat)
 al-Khanfour
 al-Shabab
 al-Aliyat

References 

Tribes of Arabia
Tribes of Iraq
Tribes of Syria